Kendal is a village in the Canadian province of Saskatchewan within the Rural Municipality of Montmartre No. 126 and Census Division No. 6. The village is located 77 km southeast of the City of Regina on Highway 48.

History 
Kendal incorporated as a village on February 17, 1919.

Demographics 

See also 

 List of communities in Saskatchewan
 Villages of Saskatchewan

References 

Villages in Saskatchewan
Montmartre No. 126, Saskatchewan
Division No. 6, Saskatchewan